The St-Just Super-Cyclone is a Canadian amateur-built aircraft produced by St-Just Aviation of Boucherville, Quebec. The aircraft is supplied as plans or as a kit for amateur construction.

Design and development
The Super-Cyclone is a development of the earlier St-Just Cyclone and is based on the Cessna 180 and Cessna 185 airframe design. The kit manufacturer terms it "a replica" of the Cessna designs. Like the 180/185 it features a strut-braced high-wing, a four-seat enclosed cabin accessed via doors, fixed conventional landing gear, skis or floats and a single engine in tractor configuration.

The aircraft is made from sheet 2024-T3 aluminum, with some parts made from 6061-T6 and 7075-T6. The standard engine used is the  Continental IO-520 four-stroke powerplant. The design includes improvements over the Cessna, including vertically hinged doors and longer span flaps combined with shorter span ailerons, in a similar manner to the Cessna 206.

Operational history
In March 2017 there were seven Super-Cyclones on the Transport Canada Civil Aircraft Register and one registered with the US Federal Aviation Administration.

Specifications (Super-Cyclone)

References

External links

Super-Cyclone
Homebuilt aircraft
Single-engined tractor aircraft
1990s Canadian civil utility aircraft
High-wing aircraft
Aircraft first flown in 1999